Ken Wright (born 11 April 1956 in Malabar, New South Wales) is an Australian former rugby footballer who played in the 1970s and 1980s.

Playing career
He started his football career in rugby union at the Randwick club in 1974. A pivotal moment in his representative career came in 1975 when, representing Sydney against the touring international team, he appeared to sidestep the entire opposition forward pack to score a try.

He was selected to represent Australia in 1975 and went on to play nine international tests. Wright's rugby union career lasted until the end of 1978 when, in 1979, he converted to rugby league and joined Eastern Suburbs and later South Sydney in the New South Wales Rugby League premiership competitions.

References

External links
 
 

Living people
Rugby league players from Sydney
Australian rugby league players
Australian rugby union players
Sydney Roosters players
South Sydney Rabbitohs players
1957 births
Australia international rugby union players
Rugby league centres
Rugby league five-eighths
Rugby union players from Sydney